This is the list of the number-one albums of the UK Compilation Chart during the 2000s.

Number-one albums

Notes

References

External links
Compilation Albums Top 40 at the Official Charts Company
The Official UK Compilation Chart at MTV
UK Top 40 Compilation Albums at BBC Radio 1

2000s in British music
United Kingdom Compilation Chart
Compilation 2000s